William Filby (born c. 1557/1560 - 30 May 1582) was an English Roman Catholic priest. He was beatified in 1886.

Life

Filby was born in Oxfordshire, England between 1557 and 1560. Educated at Lincoln College, Oxford, he was admitted to the seminary at Reims on 12 October 1579. He was ordained priest at Reims on 25 March 1581, and shortly after left for the English mission.

He was arrested in July, along with Edmund Campion at Lyford Grange, the house of a certain Francis Yate, then in Berkshire, and committed to the Tower of London, removed 14 August to the Marshalsea, and thence back to the Tower again. These arrests followed upon the Second Desmond Rebellion in Ireland and an uprising in Leinster. Filby was asked his opinion of Nicholas Sanders' landing with Spanish troops in County Kerry the previous September. Filby answered that as he did not know Sanders or his doings he had no opinion. He was sentenced 17 November, and from that date till he died was loaded with manacles. He was also deprived of his bedding for two months.

Filby was executed at Tyburn on 30 May 1582. With him died Thomas Cottam, Luke Kirby, and Laurence Richardson.

References

1560 births
1583 deaths
16th-century English Roman Catholic priests
English beatified people
Alumni of Lincoln College, Oxford
16th-century venerated Christians
Executed people from Oxfordshire
Prisoners in the Tower of London
People executed under the Tudors for treason against England
16th-century executions by England
People executed under Elizabeth I
People executed at Tyburn
Forty-one Martyrs of England and Wales